Fenimorea jongreenlawi is a species of sea snail, a marine gastropod mollusc in the family Drilliidae.

Description
The length of this marine shell varies between 9 mm and 12.5 mm.

Distribution
This marine species occurs off the Lesser Antilles, Trinidad and Tobago, St Vincent and the Grenadines

References

External links
  Fallon P.J. (2016). Taxonomic review of tropical western Atlantic shallow water Drilliidae (Mollusca: Gastropoda: Conoidea) including descriptions of 100 new species. Zootaxa. 4090(1): 1–363
 

jongreenlawi
Gastropods described in 2016